The 1999 NFL Europe season was the seventh season in 9 years of the American Football league that started out as the World League of American Football.  The Berlin Thunder replaced the England Monarchs for the 1999 season.

World Bowl '99

Frankfurt 38-24 Barcelona
Sunday, June 27, 1999 Rheinstadion Düsseldorf, Germany

1999 in American football
NFL Europe (WLAF) seasons